Djaïd Kasri (born 27 February 1987) is a French-Algerian footballer who plays as a midfielder for Union Namur Fosses-La-Ville in the Belgian Second Amateur Division.

Personal
Kasri was born in Villeneuve-Saint-Georges, France, to Algerian parents originally from the village of Tansaout in the Béjaïa Province. He grew up in Valenton, a southeastern suburb of Paris.

Club career
At age 12, Kasri joined the FC Nantes Academy. On 26 May 2007 he made his debut for the first team as a 78th-minute substitute in a Ligue 1 game against Olympique Lyon, the final game of the 2006–07 season. However, he left the club shortly after, signing a contract with Spanish club Real Zaragoza. After spending two seasons and half, he ended his contract with the club.

In July 2009, Kasri was linked with a move to English Premier League club Tottenham FC, with German club TSV 1860 München also interested in his services. In January 2010, Kasri went on trial with Belgian club Standard Liège. In May 2010, he went on trial with French Ligue 2 side Tours FC.

JS Kabylie
On 16 June 2010 Kasri signed a one-year contract with Algerian club JS Kabylie. However, on 11 July 2010, less than one month after signing, he was released from the club after failing to impress manager Alain Geiger during a pre-season camp in Morocco.

Later career
After having played for Lierse S.K. and later La Louvière Centre, he joined Union Namur Fosses-La-Ville in September 2019.

References

External links
 LFP.fr Profile
 

1987 births
Living people
Sportspeople from Villeneuve-Saint-Georges
Kabyle people
Association football midfielders
French footballers
Algerian footballers
French people of Kabyle descent
FC Nantes players
Real Zaragoza players
K.A.S. Eupen players
R.E. Virton players
Royal Antwerp F.C. players
Lierse S.K. players
UR La Louvière Centre players
Ligue 1 players
Challenger Pro League players
UJA Maccabi Paris Métropole players
Expatriate footballers in Spain
French expatriate sportspeople in Spain
Expatriate footballers in Belgium
French expatriate sportspeople in Belgium
Algerian expatriate sportspeople in Spain
Footballers from Val-de-Marne